Bletia is a genus of about 30 species of orchids (family Orchidaceae), almost all of which are terrestrial; some are occasionally lithophytic or epiphytic. It is named after Spanish botanist and pharmacist Don Luis Blet. The genus is widespread across Florida, Mexico, Central America, the West Indies, and South America as far south as Argentina.

List of species
Accepted species as of May 2014:

 Bletia adenocarpa  Rchb.f.
 Bletia amabilis  C.Schweinf.
 Bletia antillana  M.A.Diaz & Sosa
 Bletia campanulata  Lex.
 Bletia candida  Kraenzl.
 Bletia catenulata  Ruiz & Pav. 
 Bletia coccinea  Lex. 
 Bletia concolor  Dressler
 Bletia ensifolia  L.O.Williams
 Bletia florida  (Salisb.) R.Br.
 Bletia gracilis  Lodd.
 Bletia greenmaniana  L.O.Williams
 Bletia greenwoodiana  Sosa
 Bletia lilacina  A.Rich. & Galeotti
 Bletia macristhmochila  Greenm. 
 Bletia meridana  (Rchb.f.) Garay & Dunst. 
 Bletia neglecta  Sosa 
 Bletia nelsonii  Ames 
 Bletia netzeri  Senghas 
 Bletia parkinsonii  Hook. 
 Bletia parviflora  Ruiz & Pav. 
 Bletia patula  Hook. 
 Bletia punctata  Lex. 
 Bletia purpurata  A.Rich. & Galeotti 
 Bletia purpurea  (Lam.) DC. 
 Bletia reflexa  Lindl. 
 Bletia repanda  Ruiz & Pav. 
 Bletia riparia  Sosa & Palestina 
 Bletia roezlii  Rchb.f. 
 Bletia similis  Dressler 
 Bletia stenophylla  Schltr. 
 Bletia tenuifolia  Ames & C.Schweinf. 
 Bletia uniflora  Ruiz & Pav. 
 Bletia urbana  Dressler 
 Bletia warfordiana  Sosa

References

External links 
 
 

 
Orchids of Central America
Orchids of North America
Orchids of South America
Epidendreae genera
Orchids of Florida
Orchids of Mexico
Flora of the Caribbean